Alexander Nikolaevich Buinov (born 24 March 1950) is a Russian singer, songwriter and keyboardist. He is best known for his tenure with Vesyolye Rebyata between 1973 and 1989, before starting his solo career.

In the English-speaking world, he is known for his song "VDV - s neba privet" (VDV: Greetings from the Sky), which sings the praises of the Russian Airborne Troops, or VDV ("Vozdushno-desantnye voyska Rossii"; Russian script: Воздушно-десантные войска России, ВДВ; "Air-landing Forces"), a military branch of the Armed Forces of the Russian Federation. In the period closely following the outset of the 2022 Russian invasion of Ukraine, a number of parody videos have surfaced on the Internet with the apparent music of his VDV - s neba privet, but subtitled with English lyrics mocking the invasion.

Buinov is a member of the Russian Political Party United Russia. Buinov was included on a 2019 list of blacklisted people banned from performing in Ukraine due to his links to the Putin government. In 2020, during the protests following the Belarusian presidential elections, Buinov recorded a song in support of Alexander Lukashenko called “Artists for Peace – Don’t Give Away Your Loved One”, though his representative subsequently stated that Buinov hadn't known that the lyrics of the song supported Lukashenko.

References

External links
 Official site

Living people
1950 births
Soviet male singers
20th-century Russian singers
21st-century Russian singers
Russian singer-songwriters
Russian keyboardists
Place of birth missing (living people)
People's Artists of Russia
Honored Artists of the Russian Federation
Recipients of the Order of Honour (Russia)
Singers from Moscow
20th-century Russian male singers
21st-century Russian male singers
Winners of the Golden Gramophone Award